This glossary of numismatics is a list of definitions of terms and concepts relevant to numismatics and coin collecting, as well as sub-fields and related disciplines, with concise explanations for the beginner or professional.

Numismatics (ancient Greek: , meaning "monetary") is the scientific study of money and its history in all its varied forms. While numismatists are often characterized as studying coins, the discipline also includes the study of other types of money, such as banknotes, stock certificates, medals, medallions, and tokens (also referred to as exonumia).

Sub-fields and related fields of numismatics include:
 Exonumia, the study of coin-like objects such as token coins and medals, and other items used in place of legal currency or for commemoration.
 Notaphily, the study of paper money or banknotes.
 Philately, the study of postage stamps.
 Scripophily, the study and collection of stocks and bonds.

A

B

C

D

E

F

G

H

I

K

L

M

N

O

P

Q

R

S

T

U

V

Y

Z

References

Bibliography
 Coin World Glossary (7 April 2007)
 Dictionary.com
 A Guide Book of United States Coins by R.S. Yeoman 
 2005 Blackbook Price Guide to United States Paper Money 
 "Numismatic Terms and Methods" from the American Numismatic Society (archived 19 February 2007)
 The Complete Illustrated Guide to Coins & Coin Collecting by Dr. James Mackay, .

Numismatics
Numismatics
Wikipedia glossaries using description lists